The Shaoyang County Massacre (simplified Chinese: 邵阳县大屠杀; traditional Chinese:邵陽縣大屠殺), also known as the "Black Killing Wind" Incident (simplified Chinese: 黑杀风事件;  traditional Chinese: 黑殺風事件), was a massacre in Shaoyang County of Hunan Province during the Chinese Cultural Revolution. According to the official statistics in 1974, from July to September of 1968, a total of 11,177 people were arrested with 7,781 imprisoned and 113 permanently disabled, while the death toll of the massacre was 991, including 699 who were forced to commit suicide. However, some researchers argue that thousands of people died in the massacre.

During the Cultural Revolution, peasants in Dao County of Hunan Province coined the phrase "Black Killing Team (黑杀队)", meaning that 21 types of people including members of the Five Black Categories as well as their relatives were organised form such teams in order to systematically kill peasants and local officials. In 1967, the Daoxian Massacre broke out, targeting members of the Black Killing Team and causing the deaths of over 9,000 people. 

The Daoxian Massacre in 1967 made a direct impact on the "Black Killing Wind (黑杀风)" in Shaoyang. Methods of slaughter in the Shaoyang massacre included live burial, stoning, drowning, suffocating, boiling, burning, dismembering and so on; in particular, many female victims were tortured and sexually abused before death. A large number of corpses were floating down the Zi River and some of the dead bodies even blocked the water pumps inside local water purification plants, creating panic among local citizens who stopped using tap water for approximately half a month. The massacre eventually ended due to the multiple interventions from the 47th Group of the People's Liberation Army.

Historical background 

In May 1966, Mao Zedong launched the Cultural Revolution in mainland China. In 1967, peasants in Dao County of Hunan Province coined the phrase "Black Killing Team (黑杀队)", which consisted of 21 types of people such as the members of the Five Black Categories as well as their relatives. The team was said to have intention of retaliating against the peasants and local officials. As a result, from August to October 1967, the Daoxian Massacre broke out, targeting members of the Black Killing team. A total of 7,696 people were killed and another 1,397 were forced to commit suicide. 

The Daoxian Massacre had a direct impact on the massacre in Shaoyang County, also in Hunan Province.

The Black Killing Wind

The massacre 
In July 1968, the movement to capture and kill members of "Black Killing Team" began in Shaoyang. Such movement turned into a violent massacre on August 4, when the entire family of Deng Baomin (邓保民), the son of a landlord, was wiped out. The massacre was carried out by peasants in Shaoyang county and was led by local militia and the production brigade.  

Perpetrators of the massacre not only refused to cover the dead bodies of many victims, but forbade relatives of the victims from collecting the bodies. With the corpses piling up rapidly, however, many of the dead bodies were eventually disposed into the Zi River and floated down the river. Some of the bodies even blocked the water pumps inside local water purification plants and, as a result, local citizens refused to drink tap water for around half a month. When the authorities in Shaoyang City ordered the local public security bureau to bury the corpses floating in the river, the latter asked for volunteers (with a 10-yuan reward) from the rural areas of Shaoyang to remove the floating bodies from the river and bury them.

Beginning late August 1968, the 47th Group of the People's Liberation Army took multiple interventions which gradually brought an end to the massacre.

Methods of killing 
In the Shaoyang massacre, killing methods included live burial, stoning, burning, drowning in rivers or water tanks, beating with hoes or rods, dismembering with bamboo trees, and so on. Many female victims were tortured and sexually abused before being killed, some with nipples or genitals removed or pierced by iron wires.

Death toll 
According to the official statistics in 1974, a total of 11,177 people were arrested during the "Black Killing Wind" with 7,781 imprisoned and 113 permanently disabled; the death toll of the massacre was 991, including 699 who were forced to commit suicide. In addition, 702 private jails and 1,587 private handcuffs were created during the massacre.

Some researchers have pointed out that thousands of people were killed in reality. However, the Annals of Shaoyang County (1993 edition) only recognized that 295 people were killed and 277 people were forced to commit suicide during the massacre, leading to a total of 572 victims.

Aftermath 
After the Cultural Revolution, victims of the massacre were partially rehabilitated during or after the "Boluan Fanzheng" period. In 1980s, 134 cases of homicides were investigated by local authorities and a number of perpetrators received criminal charges, disciplinary reprimands or were expelled from the Chinese Communist Party (CCP). Families of the victims received certain amount of financial support and restitution.

See also 

 Daoxian Massacre
 Mass killings under communist regimes
 List of massacres in China
Boluan Fanzheng

References 

Shaoyang County
Cultural Revolution
1968 in China
Mass murder in 1968
Massacres in 1968
History of Hunan
Man-made disasters in China
Massacres in China
Massacres committed by the People's Republic of China